Specific density is the ratio of the mass versus the volume of a material.

Density vs. gravity
Specific density is based upon units of mass and volume, while specific gravity is dimensionless.

References

Physical quantities
Density
Volume
Ratios